Lalchhawnkima (born 31 May 1991) is an Indian professional footballer who plays as a defender for Aizawl in the I-League.

Career
Born in Mizoram, Lalchhawnkima played his youth football with his home state, Mizoram.

Royal Wahingdoh
He then joined Royal Wahingdoh and participated in the Shillong Premier League and the I-League 2nd Division with the Shillong side.
Lalchhawnkima made his professional debut for Royal Wahingdoh on 28 December 2014 in the Federation Cup against Mumbai.

Atletico de Kolkata
In July 2015 Lalchhawnkima was drafted to play for Atlético de Kolkata in the 2015 Indian Super League. In pre season in Spain it was reported that Lalchhawnkima had contracted a hamstring injury, which sidelined him the whole 2015 ISL season.

Aizawl
On 5 January 2016, Lalchhawnkima signed for newly promoted side Aizawl FC for 1 season. He played important role in defence in whole I-League season for Aizawl FC.

Delhi Dynamos
On 24 July 2016, Delhi Dynamos has announced that Lalchhawnkima has signed on dotted lines for the third season of Hero ISL.

Mumbai FC
Lalchhawnkima signed for Mumbai FC for the I-League 2016-17 season.

Mumbai City FC
On 23 July 2017, Kima has been picked up by Mumbai City FC for 2017-18 Hero ISL season.

Career statistics

Club

Honours

Club
Mohun Bagan
Calcutta Football League (1): 2018–19

Real Kashmir
 IFA Shield: 2021

References

1991 births
Living people
Indian footballers
Royal Wahingdoh FC players
Association football defenders
Footballers from Mizoram
I-League 2nd Division players
I-League players
ATK (football club) players
Odisha FC players
Aizawl FC players
Mumbai City FC players
Mumbai FC players
Mohun Bagan AC players